Bavar may refer to:

 Bavar (Jajce), a village in Bosnia and Herzegovina
 Bavar, Iran, a village in Iran
 Bavar 373, an Iranian missile system
 Bavar-class, Iranian missile boats
 Bavar 2, Iranian Navy vehicle
 Emily Bavar, American journalist

See also 
 Bavaria (disambiguation)
 Bawar, a region in northern India